STANAG 4626 is a NATO Standardization Agreement which defines a set of Open Architecture Standards for Avionics Architecture, particularly in the field of Integrated Modular Avionics. The purpose of this standard is to establish uniform requirements for the architecture for Integrated Modular Avionics (IMA) systems as defined by the ASAAC program. A reference implementation is on SourceForge under an Apache license.

History
This STANAG was proposed by the UK Ministry of Defence, and originated from the ASAAC effort. As for ASAAC, many major European Avionics companies  participate in its definition, such as:
 BAE Systems
 GE Aviation Systems (formerly Smiths Aerospace)
 Dassault Aviation
 Thales Group
 Airbus (formerly EADS)
 ESG Elektroniksystem- und Logistik-GmbH
 GMV Innovating Solutions

See also
 ASAAC
 Integrated Modular Avionics
 ARINC 653

External links
  STANAG 4626 part I on everyspec.com
 Open Source OS adaption layer for STANAG 4626 on sourceforge.net

4626
Aviation standards
Free and open-source software